Khalid Hachadi (born 3 May 1998) is a Moroccan professional footballer who plays as a forward for the club Chabab Mohammedia  in the Botola.

Professional career
On 14 June 2019, Hachadi signed a professional contract with in the Primeira Liga.

International career
Hachadi is a youth international for Morocco.

References

External links
 
 

1998 births
Living people
People from Volta Redonda
Moroccan footballers
Morocco youth international footballers
Olympique Club de Khouribga players
Vitória F.C. players
SCC Mohammédia players
Primeira Liga players
Botola players
Association football forwards
Moroccan expatriate footballers
Expatriate footballers in Portugal